Shotgun Messiah was a Swedish glam metal band originally from Skövde formed by guitarist Harry Cody, bassist Tim Skold, and drummer Stixx Galore. Cody and Skold were the mainstays of the band, and along with various personnel released three albums—Shotgun Messiah, Second Coming and Violent New Breed.

Shotgun Messiah disbanded in 1993.

History

First era: 1985–1991 
In 1985, the band formed in Skövde, Sweden, as Kingpin with the lineup of local musicians Tim Skold (going by "Tim Tim") (bass), Harry Cody (going by Harry K. Cody) (guitar) and Pekka "Stixx Galore" (later simply "Stixx") Ollinen (drums), and original singer J.K. Knox (Jukka Kemppainen). The band recorded the album Welcome to Bop City released by CMM Records in 1988, which yielded a No. 1 single in Sweden called "Shout It Out." In the US, the song rose to the top 100 of the Billboard Album Chart.
During the recording of Welcome To Bop City, Knox was replaced by Easy Action singer Zinny J. Zan (vocals), after the latter auditioned.

The band secured a record deal with Relativity Records. They discovered that a San Francisco band had a copyright on the name Kingpin, so when the group relocated to Hollywood, they changed their name to Shotgun Messiah. The band remixed Welcome To Bop City and it was released in September 1989 as Shotgun Messiah. Shotgun Messiah embarked on their first North American solo tour to support the album.

The Washington Post called their music "cocky, loud and rough"

Second era: 1991–1993 
Frontman Zinny J. Zan departed the band in 1990 and Tim Skold took over vocal duties. Shotgun Messiah drafted an American bassist, Bobby Lycon, to fill Skold's former position. Cody dropped the K. from his professional name. In 1991, the band's follow up album Second Coming was released, including their most recognizable hit "Heartbreak Blvd". Stylistically, the band's music evolved into a hybrid of metal, rap, pop, and classical.

Shotgun Messiah released I Want More, an EP featuring cover versions of songs by the Ramones, The Stooges, and the New York Dolls in 1992.

Third era: 1993 
By 1993,  Cody and Skold were the only remaining members of Shotgun Messiah. In the studio, they created what would be the last Shotgun Messiah album, Violent New Breed. This album was significantly different from the previous efforts as it focused heavily on an industrial metal and punk style.

The duo embarked on the "Violent New Breed" tour to support the album.  After the tour, Shotgun Messiah disbanded when their label, Relativity began to focus on rap music.

Post-Shotgun Messiah 
After Shotgun Messiah disbanded, Skold released a solo album entitled Skold. He then joined bands KMFDM and MDFMK, collaborating with the former on the album, Skold vs. KMFDM. From 2002 to 2008, Skold was with Marilyn Manson, creating two albums, and replacing Twiggy Ramirez. He was also a member of supergroup Doctor Midnight and the Mercy Cult (DMTMC), formed in 2009, which released the album I Declare: Treason (2011).

Skold released three more solo albums – Anomie (2011), The Undoing (2016), and Never is Now (2019).

Cody joined the band Coma with Saigon Kick singer Matt Kramer in 1994, but the project was short-lived. In 1996, he teamed up with Rhino Bucket singer Georg Dolivo to form Das Cabal. The band recorded "What Do You Want" for the Boogie Boy movie soundtrack in 1998.

Cody collaborated with Tom Waits, performing guitar and banjo on Waits' Real Gone (2004) album and Orphans: Brawlers, Bawlers & Bastards (2006) boxset compilation.

In 2005, Cody composed the score for the film Wassup Rockers.

Zan and Stixx (going only by his first name) reunited in 2012 as Shotgun. They wanted to celebrate the 25th anniversary of Welcome to Bop City, the original debut album from the band's first incarnation as Kingpin before changing their name to Shotgun Messiah. They released a live album under the Shotgun moniker. Their line-up at this point included Zan (lead vocals), Rob Marcello (guitar and backing vocals), Chris Laney (bass and backing vocals), Stixx (drums and backing vocals), and Jonas Beijer (keyboards).

Lineups

Shotgun Messiah 
 Zinny J. Zan – lead vocals
 Harry Cody – guitars, backing vocals
 Tim Skold – bass, backing vocals
 Stixx Galore – drums, backing vocals

Second Coming 
 Tim Skold – lead vocals
 Harry Cody – guitars, backing vocals
 Bobby Lycon – bass, backing vocals
 Stixx Galore – drums, backing vocals

Violent New Breed 
 Tim Skold – lead vocals, programming, bass
 Harry Cody – guitars, backing vocals, programming
 Bill Bruce – rhythm guitar (live)
 Pat Guyton – bass (live)
 Bjarne "B. J." Johansson – drums (live)

Discography

Singles

References

External links
 
 Interview with Lead Singer Tim Skold
 The Official Unofficial website for Tim Skold (former bassist/singer member)
 The Original Tim Skold: Sycophant Fansite

 
1985 establishments in Sweden
Glam metal musical groups from California
Heavy metal musical groups from California
Industrial metal musical groups
Musical groups established in 1985
Musical groups disestablished in 1993
Musical groups from Los Angeles
Swedish glam metal musical groups
Swedish hard rock musical groups
Swedish industrial music groups